Donald Jay Irwin (September 7, 1926 – July 7, 2013) was a Democratic member of the U.S. House of Representatives from Connecticut's 4th district, Connecticut State Treasurer and mayor of Norwalk, Connecticut.

Early life and family
He was born to American parents, Montrose Wellington Irwin and Marion Reynolds Irwin in Rosario, Argentina in 1926. Irwin came to the United States in 1945 to attend Yale College. Soon after enrolling at Yale, he joined the United States Army, where he served with the Joint Brazil-United States Military Commission in Rio de Janeiro. After army service, he returned to Yale and graduated in 1951. He played rugby and soccer at Yale. In addition, he swam for the school team. He taught Spanish at Yale while a student there. He married Mary Stapleton on August 23, 1952. Together they had four children; Patrick (born 1953), Marion, Lucy (born 1959) and Stephen (born 1960). He graduated Yale Law School in 1954. He was admitted to the bar and commenced the practice of law in Connecticut.

Political career
Irwin served as member of the Norwalk Board of Education. He was elected as a Democrat to the Eighty-sixth Congress (January 3, 1959 – January 3, 1961). He was a delegate to Democratic National Convention from Connecticut in 1960. He was an unsuccessful candidate for reelection in 1960 to the Eighty-seventh Congress. He was appointed general counsel, United States Information Agency, 1961. He was appointed treasurer of the State of Connecticut by Gov. John N. Dempsey in 1962. He served from 1961 to 1963 Irwin was elected to the Eighty-ninth and Ninetieth Congresses (January 3, 1965 – January 3, 1969). He was an unsuccessful candidate for reelection in 1968 to the Ninety-first Congress. He then resumed the practice of law.
Irwin was elected mayor of Norwalk, Connecticut, in November 1971, defeating Jacob Rudolf. He was reelected in 1973 and was not a candidate for reelection in 1975. Irwin died of heart problems on July 7, 2013, at the age of 86.

Life after politics
After ending his career in politics, Irwin began involving himself in local teaching jobs around Norwalk. He was a permanent substitute teacher a Brien McMahon high school between the years 1995–2000. He also became a grandfather to 11 grandchildren. His first son, Patrick, had two children; Ana and Thomas Irwin. His first daughter, Marion, also had two children; Homer and Mary Turgeon. Lucile gave birth to three children; Ella, Stuart, and Owen Christoph. His youngest, Stephen, had four children; Jay, Matthew, Luke, and Elizabeth Irwin.

Associations
Member, Knights of Columbus
Member, Jaycees

References

1926 births
2013 deaths
Argentine emigrants to the United States
Argentine people of English descent
Burials in Saint John's Cemetery (Norwalk, Connecticut)
Connecticut lawyers
Mayors of Norwalk, Connecticut
People from Rosario, Santa Fe
State treasurers of Connecticut
United States Army soldiers
Yale College alumni
Yale Law School alumni
Democratic Party members of the United States House of Representatives from Connecticut
20th-century American politicians
20th-century American lawyers